Mutab Al-Najrani (born 23 February 1991) is a Saudi Arabian football player who plays for Al-Washm as a forward.

External links

 

Living people
1991 births
Association football forwards
Saudi Arabian footballers
Najran SC players
Al-Qadsiah FC players
Khaleej FC players
Al-Fayha FC players
Al-Kawkab FC players
Al-Ansar FC (Medina) players
Al-Okhdood Club players
Al-Washm Club players
Saudi Professional League players
Saudi First Division League players
Saudi Second Division players
Place of birth missing (living people)